London League may refer to:

 London League (rugby league), a contemporary rugby league competition 
 London League (football), a defunct association football league